HMS Imogen FC is a defunct sports club of Istanbul, Ottoman Empire. The club was founded by Englishmen.

History
They were the first club to win the Istanbul Football League.

Honours
Istanbul Football League:

Winners: 1904–1905

League tables

Istanbul Football League:

1904–05 Istanbul Football League: 1) HMS Imogene FC 2) Moda FC 3) Cadi-Keuy FC 4) Elpis FC

1905–06 Istanbul Football League: 1) Cadi-Keuy FC 2) HMS Imogene FC 3) Moda FC 4) Elpis FC

1906–07 Istanbul Football League: 1) Cadi-Keuy FC 2) Moda FC 3) HMS Imogene FC 4) Galatasaray SK 5) Elpis FC

1907–08 Istanbul Football League: 1) Moda FC 2) Cadi-Keuy FC 3) Galatasaray SK 4) Elpis FC 5) HMS Imogene FC

1908–09 Istanbul Football League: 1) Galatasaray SK 2) Moda FC 3) HMS Imogene FC 4) Cadi-Keuy FC

See also
List of Turkish Sports Clubs by Foundation Dates

References
 Imogene Futbol Takımı. Türk Futbol Tarihi vol.1. page(23). (June 1992) Türkiye Futbol Federasyonu Yayınları.

Defunct football clubs in Turkey
Association football clubs established in 1904
Association football clubs disestablished in 1909
Sport in Istanbul
1904 establishments in the Ottoman Empire
1909 disestablishments in the Ottoman Empire